The 2017 Korea Open (also known as the 2017 KEB Hana Bank-Incheon Airport Korea Open for sponsorship purposes) was a women's  professional tennis tournament played on hard courts. It was the 14th edition of the tournament, and part of the 2017 WTA Tour. It took place in Seoul, South Korea between 18 and 24 September 2017.

Points and prize money

Point distribution

Prize money

* per team

Singles main-draw entrants

Seeds 

 1 Rankings are as of September 11, 2017

Other entrants 
The following players received wildcards into the singles main draw:
  Han Na-lae 
  Jang Su-jeong
  Katarina Zavatska

The following player received entry using a protected ranking into the singles main draw:
  Misa Eguchi

The following players received entry from the qualifying draw:
  Priscilla Hon
  Luksika Kumkhum 
  Karolína Muchová 
  Peangtarn Plipuech 
  Arantxa Rus
  Varatchaya Wongteanchai

Withdrawals 
Before the tournament
  Eugenie Bouchard →replaced by  Mariana Duque Mariño
  Misaki Doi →replaced by  Misa Eguchi
  Kirsten Flipkens →replaced by  Chang Kai-chen
  Varvara Lepchenko →replaced by  Richèl Hogenkamp
  Sloane Stephens →replaced by  Ekaterina Alexandrova
  Elena Vesnina →replaced by  Denisa Allertová

Doubles main-draw entrants

Seeds 

1 Rankings are as of September 11, 2017

Other entrants 
The following pair received a wildcard into the doubles main draw:
  Jeong Su-nam /  Park Sang-hee

Withdrawals 
During the tournament
  Sorana Cîrstea

Finals

Singles 

  Jeļena Ostapenko defeated  Beatriz Haddad Maia, 6–7(5–7), 6–1, 6–4

Doubles 

  Kiki Bertens /  Johanna Larsson defeated  Luksika Kumkhum /  Peangtarn Plipuech, 6–4, 6–1

References

External links 
 

 
Korea Open
Korea Open
2010s in Seoul
Korea Open